The Kurdish Institute of Paris, founded in February 1983 by (amongst others) film producer Yılmaz Güney and poet Cigerxwîn, is an organization focused on the Kurdish language, culture, and history. It is one of the principal academic centers of the Kurdish language in Europe. Its main publications include the linguistic journal Kurmancî, a monthly press review about Kurdish issues titled Bulletin de liaison et d'information (Bulletin of Contact and Information), and Études Kurdes, a research journal in French.

Most of the institute's activities are focused on the Kurmanji dialect of Kurdish. The institute has a library preserving thousands of historical documents, pamphlets and periodicals about Kurds. Two representatives from the French Ministry of Interior and the Ministry of Culture provide the link between the institute and the Government of France. The institute is headed by Kendal Nezan as president, and Abbas Vali (Swansea University) and Fuad Hussein (University of Amsterdam) as the two vice presidents.

Kurmancî

 is a linguistic magazine published twice a year since 1987 to spread the results of the Kurdish Institute's linguistic seminars on problems of terminology and standardisation of the Kurdish language. All issues of this periodical are available on the publisher's website, as is the Kurdish–French–English–Turkish index of the first twenty issues. The name  is a Kurdish spelling of the name of the most widely spoken dialect of the Kurdish language, Kurmanji.

See also
 The Kurdish Digital Library, online since 10 December 2010.

References

External links
Kurdish Institute of Paris 
Online books available in the library of the Kurdish Institute of Paris
Kurmancî official website 

Kurdish diaspora in Europe
Kurdish organisations
Organizations based in Paris
Diaspora organizations in France
Kurdish culture in France